The Michigan Air Line Trail was a working title for a  non-motorized pathway running across the southern portion of Michigan's Lower Peninsula from Port Huron (Lake Huron) to South Haven (Lake Michigan). The trail is now known as the Great Lake to Lake Trail, Route #1. It is part of a system of cross-state trails proposed by the Michigan Trails and Greenways Alliance back in 2007.

The Michigan Department of Natural Resources, Michigan Department of Transportation, Michigan Trails and Greenways Alliance and approximately 30 local jurisdictions have made the Great Lake to Lake Trail, Route #1 a reality. The inaugural ride to celebrate the contiguous connection of the route was held in September 2019.

Currently trail planners are determining the final route to eliminate the need for temporary connections.  The crossing of major freeways, Interstate 69 (I-69), I-94, and US Highway 23 (US 23) are major considerations. MDOT constructed a pedestrian/trail bridge over the M-5 freeway in Commerce Township in 2018 removing that obstacle to continuity of the trail.

Much of the route follows a historic rail line known as the Michigan Air Line Railroad, which began in 1869 with the intention that it would be a new route from Chicago to Port Huron.  The Canada Southern Railway would connect to it via ferry at the Saint Clair River and traverse Southwestern Ontario, Canada to connect to Buffalo, New York.

This new destination trail does not overtake identities of the individual trails along its length but enhances the connectivity and tourism opportunities of all the trails.  Completion of this trail will add to Michigan’s identity as the top trail state in the nation, boosting tourism and generating new nonmotorized connections as communities all along the way endeavor to tap into this vital recreation and transportation artery.

There is also a seven-mile segment of this trail corridor that is officially designated as the Michigan Air Line Trail; it is the segment in western Oakland County adjoining the West Bloomfield Trail on the east and the Huron Valley Trail on the west. This segment is owned and operated by the CW2 Trailway Management Council, composed of representatives from the communities of Wixom, Walled Lake and Commerce Township. The first phase of the trail was opened in the spring of 2020 and is the only portion of the overall cross-state trail which still carries the Michigan Air Line Trail name. A second two-mile Phase Two is currently under development.

Trails within the Michigan Air Line
Clinton River Trail
Battle Creek Linear Park
Falling Waters Trail
Huron Valley Trail
Kal-Haven Trail
Lakelands Trail State Park
Macomb Orchard Trail
Michigan Air Line Trail
West Bloomfield Trail

References

External links
Proposed Great Lake to Lake Trail

Rail trails in Michigan